George Brander Sime (28 February 1915 – 9 September 1990) was a British and Scottish international field hockey player who competed in the 1948 Summer Olympics.

He was a member and captain of the British field hockey team that won the silver medal. He played all five matches as halfback.

References

External links
 
George Sime on Olympics Database

1915 births
1990 deaths
British male field hockey players
Olympic field hockey players of Great Britain
Field hockey players at the 1948 Summer Olympics
Olympic silver medallists for Great Britain
Olympic medalists in field hockey
Medalists at the 1948 Summer Olympics